Herbert Butler Powell (July 13, 1903 – April 3, 1998) was a United States Army general and diplomat. He served as Commanding General of the United States Continental Army Command, and was later United States Ambassador to New Zealand and Samoa.

Early life and career
Powell was born in Monmouth, Oregon on July 13, 1903. He joined the Oregon National Guard as a private in 1919, rising to the rank of sergeant. He received his commission in 1926 after graduating from the University of Oregon with a degree in journalism. Powell graduated from the Command and General Staff School in 1941.

During World War II, Powell was chief of staff of the 75th Infantry Division, fighting in Europe. After the war, he graduated from the National War College in 1949. In the Korean War, Powell commanded the only American regiment, the 17th Infantry, to reach the Yalu River. Powell later commanded the 25th Infantry Division at Schofield Barracks, where he was known as the "Soldier's General." He briefly commanded the United States Army Pacific for three months, from April to July 1956, as an interim commander for General Blackshear M. Bryan. He later received promotions to lieutenant general and general. Subsequent commands included Commanding General for the Third United States Army in Fort McPherson, Georgia, and Commanding General of the United States Continental Army Command, Fort Monroe, Virginia.

Other significant duties for Powell were Commandant of the United States Army Infantry School at Fort Benning, Georgia, and Deputy Commanding General for Reserve Forces at Fort Monroe. After his retirement in 1963, President John F. Kennedy appointed him the United States Ambassador to New Zealand and Samoa, a post he filled from 1963 to 1967. He died on April 3, 1998 in a nursing home in Williamsburg, Virginia. Powell was buried at Arlington National Cemetery beside his first wife Beryl King Powell (1904–1989) on April 10, 1998. He had remarried with Grace Eudora Streety Tuggle, the widow of an Army colonel.

Awards and decorations
Powell's awards and decorations include the Distinguished Service Cross, the Army Distinguished Service Medal, the Legion of Merit with oak leaf cluster, the Bronze Star Medal with two oak leaf clusters, the Purple Heart, and the Air Medal. He was also a qualified army aviator. Powell was inducted posthumously into the University of Oregon School of Journalism and Communication Hall of Achievement on October 14, 2004.

References

|-

1903 births
1998 deaths
People from Monmouth, Oregon
Oregon National Guard personnel
Military personnel from Oregon
University of Oregon alumni
United States Army Command and General Staff College alumni
United States Army personnel of World War II
Recipients of the Legion of Merit
National War College alumni
United States Army personnel of the Korean War
Recipients of the Air Medal
Recipients of the Distinguished Service Cross (United States)
United States Army generals
United States Army aviators
Recipients of the Distinguished Service Medal (US Army)
Ambassadors of the United States to New Zealand
20th-century American diplomats
People from Williamsburg, Virginia
Burials at Arlington National Cemetery